Fults Hill Prairie State Natural Area, also known as the Fults Hill Prairie Nature Preserve, is an Illinois Nature Preserve on  in Monroe County, Illinois, United States.  A key feature of the preserve is a  hill prairie located on the east bluff of the Mississippi River overlooking the American Bottom near Fults, Illinois.  The Fults Hill Prairie has been listed as a National Natural Landmark.

Natural resources
The preserve is dominated by steep Mississippi River limestone bluffs and ravines.  On top of the bluff lies a thick coating of windblown loess soil.  This parcel of land has grown into a hill prairie of grasses and forbs characteristic of the tallgrass prairie, and varied by snatches of fire-resistant trees such as the bur oak.

The preserve is home to a wide variety of species found in few other location in Illinois. Some of these include big bluestem grass, plains scorpion, cactus, skinks, and fence lizards.

History and description
The upland or hill prairie was once the dominant ecosystem for much of the land that became the U.S. state of Illinois, the Prairie State.  The state's Department of Natural Resources, which owns the prairie parcel, describes it as containing "the largest complex of the highest quality, essentially undisturbed loess hill prairies along the Mississippi River in Illinois."  Most of the prairie acreage that makes up this parcel apparently remained un-plowed during the pioneer years of the 1800s.

The nature preserve was dedicated as an Illinois Nature Preserve in 1970, and was listed as a National Natural Landmark in 1986.

It is owned and managed by the Illinois Department of Natural Resources.

See also
 Revis Hill Prairie State Natural Area
 Kaskaskia–Cahokia Trail

References

External links

State parks of Illinois
Protected areas of Monroe County, Illinois
Protected areas established in 1970
State Natural Areas of Illinois
1970 establishments in Illinois
National Natural Landmarks in Illinois